Dr. Neal L. Cohen was the New York City Health Commissioner starting in 1998 and before that, Mental Health Commissioner since March 1996.  In January 2007, he began teaching full time at Hunter College as a Distinguished Lecturer in Public Health and the School of Social Work, later becoming interim dean of the CUNY School of Public Health at Hunter College and acting associate provost for Health and Social Welfare at Hunter College.

Cohen has been clinical director and vice chairman of the psychiatry department at the Mount Sinai Medical Center, director of psychiatry at Gouverneur Hospital, and served on the board of the city's Health and Hospitals Corporation since March 1996.

Education 
Cohen earned his medical degree from New York University School of Medicine  in 1970.

References 

New York University Grossman School of Medicine alumni
Hunter College faculty
American psychiatrists
Living people
Commissioners of Health of the City of New York
Year of birth missing (living people)
Physicians from New York City
Icahn School of Medicine at Mount Sinai faculty